The trolleybus system forms part of the public transport network of Varna, the third most populous city in Bulgaria.

History 

The system was opened on January 1, 1986; it was the 4th network to open in Bulgaria after Sofia, Plovdiv and just a few months earlier Pleven. 

Initially the network expanded rapidly, reaching its peak of 8 lines at some point. First the city received 15 new trolleybus Skoda 14TR and 3 used Skoda 9TR from Sofia and Plovdiv, the latter ones were used for training purposes. The following years the city received 15 more new Skoda 14TR and 36 new articulated DAC-Chavdar.  

In 1999 the city bought 3 used Skoda 14TR (one of them modernized) from Czechia. 

In 2003 the city bought 5 used Skoda 15TR from Czechia to replace the already out of service DAC-Chavdar vehicles. Additional 4 used Skoda 15 TR were bought from Czechia and Slovakia in 2007. 

In 2017 all Skoda 15TR were taken out of service due to a fire that burnt down one of them. 

In 2014 along with 3 other cities Varna was granted money through a European Union program to purchase 30 new trolleybuses Skoda Solaris 26TR which replaced all remaining Skoda 14TR (Two units were kept to be used for training purposes).  

==Lines==

Current routes:

Previous routes

Fleet

Current fleet

Former fleet

See also

Asparuhov most
List of trolleybus systems

References

External links

 
 

Transport in Varna, Bulgaria
Varna
Varna